The 2009–10 Azadegan League was the 19th season of the Azadegan League and ninth as the second highest division since its establishment in 1991. The season featured 19 teams from the 2008–09 Azadegan League, three new teams relegated from the 2008–09 Persian Gulf Cup: Payam Mashhad, Damash and Bargh Shiraz and four new teams promoted from the 2008–09 2nd Division: Sanati Kaveh, Foolad Novin, Mes Sarcheshmeh and Naft Tehran. Gostaresh Foulad replaced Niroye Zamini while Iranjavan replaced Moghavemat Mersad. Aluminium Arak changed their name into Shensa Arak. The league started on 10 August 2009 and ended on 27 June 2010. Shahrdari Tabriz and Naft Tehran won the Azadegan League title for the first time in their history. Shahrdari Tabriz, Naft Tehran and Sanat Naft promoted to the Persian Gulf Cup.

Events

Start of season
The league was to feature three teams relegated from Persian Gulf Cup in 2008–09; Bargh Shiraz, Damash Gilan, and Payam Mashhad.
It featured four teams promoted from 2009–10 Azadegan League: Folad Novin, Naft Tehran, Mes Sarcheshme, and Sanati Kaveh.
Gostaresh Foolad ended its 2008/2009 3rd Division campaign in first place( Group A)  and can promoted in 2nd Division. They  bought Niroye Zamini. So They currently play the  2009–10 Azadegan League.
Iranjavan ended its 2008/2009 2nd Division campaign in third place( Group A)  and can not promoted in 2009–10 Azadegan League. On 30 August 2009 they bought Moghavemat Mersad and they returned to Azadegan League.
In September 2009 Aluminium Arak F.C. terminated their sports activities due to financial problems. Shensa Arak F.C. took over their license.

Teams

Group A

Group B

Managerial changes

Final standings

Group A

Group B

Results table

Group A

Group B

Player statistics

Top goalscorers

Group A
17 goals
  Ali Karimi (Sha. Tabriz)
  Mostafa Shojaei (Sepahan Novin)

9 goals
  Ali Abolfathi (Sanati Kaveh)

8 goals
  Mehrdad Avakh (Sha. Bandar Abbas)
  Jalaledin Alimohammadi (Sepahan Novin)
  Carlos Eduardo Salazar (Mes Rafsanjan)
  Ghasem Akbari (Etka Gorgan)

7 goals
  Meysam Khodashenas (Tarbiat Yazd)
  Ruhollah Arab (Sanat Naft Abadan F.C.)

Group B
12 goals
  Rasoul Khatibi (Gostaresh Foolad)

10 goals
  Ali Amiri (Damash Gilan)

9 goals
  Reza Taheri (Damash Gilan)
  Ali Alizadeh (Bargh Shiraz)

8 goals
  Amir Rafati (Gol Gohar)

7 goals
  Founéké Sy (Nassaji Mazandaran)
  Hadi Dehghani (Aluminium Hormozgan F.C.)
  Saeed Babaei (Mes Sarcheshme)
  Akbar Saghiri (Naft Tehran)
  Ahmad Hasanzadeh (Mes Sarcheshme)

Play Off
First leg to be played July 2, 2010; return leg to be played July 8, 2010

First leg

Return leg

Attendance

Average home attendance

Highest attendance

Notes:Updated to games played on 27 June 2010. Source: iplstats.com

See also
 2009–10 Persian Gulf Cup
 2009–10 Iran Football's 2nd Division
 2009–10 Iran Football's 3rd Division
 2009–10 Hazfi Cup
 Iranian Super Cup
 2009–10 Iranian Futsal Super League

References

Azadegan League seasons
Iran
2009–10 in Iranian football leagues